Tree (stylized as TREE) is the seventh Japanese studio album (fourteenth overall) by South Korean pop duo Tohoshinki, released by Avex Trax on March 5, 2014. The record was released in four physical versions, each with a seasonal theme cover – Version A (Spring/Summer), a CD+DVD version with music videos; Version B (Autumn), another CD+DVD version with off-shot movies; Version C (Winter), a CD only version with two bonus tracks; and Version D, a fan club limited edition with a CD-Extra. Musically, Tree is a varied pop music album that is influenced by a broad range of musical genres, such as electronic dance music, hip hop, R&B, swing jazz, rock music, power ballads, and reggae. Recording for the album began well before the launch of their sixth Japanese studio album Time in early 2013.

Tree was Tohoshinki's fourth consecutive album to debut at number one on the Oricon Albums Chart and the Billboard Japan Top Albums, selling 225,000 copies on its first week of release. With Tree, Tohoshinki became the first foreign group in Japan to have three consecutive studio albums with first-week sales of over 200,000 copies, breaking Bon Jovi's thirteen-year record. Less than four weeks after release, the album earned a platinum certification by the Recording Industry Association of Japan (RIAJ) for shipments of over 250,000 copies.

All four of the album's commercially successful singles – "Ocean", "Scream", "Very Merry Xmas", and "Hide & Seek / Something" – debuted at number two on the Oricon Singles Chart and achieved gold certifications by the RIAJ. To promote the album, Tohoshinki embarked on their seventh nationwide tour, Tree: Live Tour 2014 from April to June 2014.

Background and release
Tree was officially announced on January 10, 2014 through Tohoshinki's official website. It contains a total of fourteen tracks, including two bonus tracks, all which were revealed on January 21, 2014. Following the convention of using the first letter 'T' in their album titles, the duo explained in a January 2014 interview that the name "Tree" was meant to be used as a metaphor for their growth as artists. Tree is also an element of growth in East Asian mythology. Yunho and Changmin added in a later interview that the name was actually inspired by the children's picture book The Giving Tree, and that Tree sends a message about giving.

Recording sessions for Tree coincided with the duo's seventh Korean album, Tense, which was released in January 2014. Similar to the duo's last two Japanese records, Tree delves into the usual electronic landscape in its dance tracks, some with hip hop and rock influences. The duo also experimented with genres they previously have not attempted before, such as swing jazz and reggae. A variety of different power ballads permeate throughout the album; "I Love You", written by Katsuhiko Yamamoto, emphasizes the duo's emotive vocal harmony with minimalist programming. Only 22 people were behind the song's instrumental arrangement, playing the piano, guitar, cello, and strings. However, Yamamoto's other composition in the album, uses smooth R&B arrangements. The song was written after the 2011 Tōhoku earthquake and tsunami and its lyrical content refers to hope and faith.

On January 28, 2014, the official covers for Tree were revealed on Japanese newspapers, music retailers and Tohoshinki's official website. Each album cover represented a season of the year; Version A, a CD+DVD version with music videos, fell on Spring/Summer; Version B, a CD+DVD version with off-shot movies and live performances, fell on Autumn; and Version C, a CD-only version with two bonus tracks, fell on Winter. Version D, which features bare-shouldered Yunho and Changmin on the cover, was a limited edition that was exclusive for registered members of Bigeast, Tohoshinki's official fanclub in Japan. First press limited editions also included a photo card.

A short version of the music video for the album's promotional single "Tree of Life" premiered on February 4, 2014. Tree was introduced on TV Osaka's Japan Countdown on February 9, 2014. On February 15, the special website for Tree was opened, and the lyrics to seven songs in the album were revealed. In early March 2014, Tohoshinki celebrated the album release with an exhibition opened in Shibuya Tower Records in Tokyo. Pre-orders for Tree were sent out a few days prior to the official March 5 release date.

Promotion

In August 2013, the duo performed "Ocean" and "Scream" at the Nissan Stadium in Yokohama, the last stop of their Time: Live Tour 2013. In November 2013, during their fan-meet concert The Mission II in Saitama, Tohoshinki revealed plans for a new nationwide tour in 2014. Following the duo's unveil, twenty-six dates for their tour were announced, and Tree: Live Tour 2014 was officially announced in January 2014. The tour is set to begin in April 2014 with three shows in the Yokohama Arena.

Singles
"Ocean" was released as the first single from the album, on June 12, 2013. Released three months after their sixth Japanese album Time, the duo promoted "Ocean" in their 2013 Japan-wide concert tour, Time: Live Tour 2013. The duo performed "Ocean" at the Nissan Stadium in Yokohama, the last stop of the tour. "Ocean" is the album's best-selling single, with nearly 150,000 copies sold on its first week of release.

"Scream" was released as the album's second single on September 4, 2013. Serving as the theme song for the Japanese horror film Sadako 3D 2, the song was first revealed in July 2013. Like "Ocean", Tohoshinki also promoted "Scream" in their Time Tour, and debuted their first performance of "Scream" at the Nissan Stadium. "Scream" debuted at number two on the Oricon Singles Chart and peaked at number two on Billboard's Japan Hot 100. Also debuting at number two, the album's third single, "Very Merry Xmas", was released on November 27, 2013 as a special Christmas single. Supported by the holiday season, the song charted considerably well in radio airplay charts compared to "Ocean" and "Scream", both which have failed to chart in the top fifteen. "Very Merry Xmas" charted in the top ten in the Billboard Japan Hot Top Airplay, and peaked at number nineteen on the Billboard Japan Adult Contemporary Airplay. Within a week of its release, the single was certified gold by the Recording Industry Association of Japan (RIAJ) for shipments of over 100,000.

The double A-sided "Hide & Seek / "Something" was released as the album's fourth and final single, on February 5, 2014, one month before the official release date of Tree. "Something", originally recorded in Korean, was first released in South Korea on January 6, 2014 as the lead single of the duo's seventh Korean studio album Tense. "Hide & Seek" was featured as the theme song for the Japanese television drama, Team Batista 4, which premiered on Japan's Fuji TV on January 7, 2014.

Commercial performance
Debuting atop the daily Oricon Albums Chart and selling 156,491 copies on its first day of release, Tree maintained its number one spot for the next four days, making it Tohoshinki's first studio album and second overall release to top the daily Oricon Albums Chart for five days in a row.

Tree debuted at number one on both the weekly Oricon Albums Chart and the Billboard Japan Top Albums, selling approximately 225,000 copies on its first week of release. It gave Tohoshinki their fourth consecutive number one album in Japan. The album was Tohoshinki's third studio album and fourth record to shift over 200,000 copies on its first week, breaking a record previously set by Bon Jovi thirteen years ago. The album was Tohoshinki's second studio album to top the Oricon's monthly album chart, selling 252,155 copies by March 31, 2014. It was certified platinum by the Recording Industry Association of Japan less than four weeks after it was released.

Track listing

Notes
Version D is only available on the Bigeast Official Shop, which requires Bigeast membership.

Personnel
Credits adapted from the liner notes of Tree.

 Performers and musicians

Tohoshinki (Yunho, Changmin) – vocals, background vocals
Yoo Young-jin – background vocals (track 6)
Kim Hyeon-a – background vocals (track 6)
Kumi Sasaki – background vocals (track 13)
Yuko Ohtaki – background vocals (track 13)
Hiroaki Takeuchi – background vocals (track 13)
Robin – background vocals (track 14) 
Katsuhiko Yamamoto – piano (tracks 1, 15)
Tomohiko Osakabe – bass (track 4)
Kadowaki strings – strings (tracks 4, 15)
Shinjiroh Inoue – background vocals (track 13); all instruments (tracks 5, 8, 12); piano (track 13); guitar (tracks 7, 13)
Kang Soo-ho – drums (track 6)
Jeon Seong-sik – double bass (track 6)

Sam Lee – guitar (track 6)
Kim Dong-ha – trumpet (track 6)
Lee Han-jin – trombone (track 6)
Kim Sang-il – saxophone (track 6)
Taizo Nakamura – bass (tracks 7, 13)
Shika strings – strings (tracks 7, 13)
Steven Lee – keyboards (track 9, 11)
hitchhiker – guitar, keyboards (track 10)
Andreas Stone Johansson – keyboards (track 11)
Andreas Oberg – guitar (track 11)
Kentaro Kawai – guitar (track 15)
Tomoji Sogawa – piano (track 16)
Kiyoto Konda – guitar(track 16)
Konno strings – strings (track 16)

Technical personnel

Katsutoshi Yasuhara – direction (tracks 1–5, 7–9, 11–16)
Yoo Young-jin – direction, recording, mixing (track 6)
hitchhiker – direction, sound processing (track 10)
Atsushi Hattori – mixing, recording (tracks 1, 7, 15, 16); mixing (track 14)
Jung Eui-seok – mixing, recording (track 10)
Naoki Yamada – mixing (track 2–5, 8, 9, 11–13)
Hideaki Jinbu – recording (tracks 1–5, 7–9, 11–16)
Oh Sung-gun with assistant Song Ju-yong – recording (track 6)

Kwang Jung-shin with assistant Jeong Mo-yun – recording (track 6)
Junichi Shinohara – editing (track 3)
Makoto Yamadoi – editing (track 4)
Katsuhiko Yamamoto – programming (tracks 4, 15)
Shinjiroh Inoue – programming (tracks 7, 13)
Steven Lee – programming (tracks 9, 11)
Andreas Stone Johansson – programming (track 11)
Tomoji Sogawa – programming (track 16)

Charts

Weekly charts

Sales

Certifications

Release history

See also
TVXQ albums discography
List of Oricon number-one albums of 2014

References

External links
 Special website

2014 albums
TVXQ albums
Avex Group albums
Japanese-language albums